Alemayehu Roba (born 27 October 1972) is a retired Ethiopian middle distance runner who specialized in the 1500 metres.

He won a silver medal at the 1990 World Junior Championships and a bronze medal at the 1991 All-Africa Games. He competed at the 1991 World Championships, but did not progress from the qualification round.

References

External links

1972 births
Living people
Ethiopian male middle-distance runners
African Games bronze medalists for Ethiopia
African Games medalists in athletics (track and field)
Athletes (track and field) at the 1991 All-Africa Games
20th-century Ethiopian people